The Chutka Nuclear Power Plant is a proposed nuclear power plant to be built on a  area, near Chutka Village of Mandla district of Madhya Pradesh. The site is near Kanha National Park, one of the tiger reserves of India and the largest national park of Madhya Pradesh state in India.

The project will have an installed capacity of 1400 Megawatt.

History
After the government allotted  of land for the project, the Chutka, Tatighat, Kunda, Bhaliwara and Patha villagers decided to start an indefinite agitation from 25 October 2015. Most of them were displaced by the Bargi Dam in 1984.
Meanwhile, within the 30-kilometre radius of the site, a survey was completed in the  area, which is almost 60% covered with water, the remaining barren land and a small area of cultivated land with poor soil conditions. The survey was started in December 2012.

Design and specification
The proposed 700 MW IPHWR-700 reactors are indigenous and similar to the ones currently under construction in Kakrapar Atomic Power Station (KAPP-3 &4) and Rajasthan Atomic Power Station (RAPP-7 & 8).

Cost and economics
Being built by the Nuclear Power Corporation of India, the project is estimated to cost  17,000 Crore ( 2.56 billions) as of January 2014.

See also 
 Nuclear power in India

References
 

Proposed nuclear power stations
Proposed power stations in India
Nuclear power stations in India